This is a list of members of the fourth legislative session of the Estonian Parliament (Riigikogu) following the 1929 elections (held on 11–13 May 1929). It sat between 15 June 1929 and 14 June 1932, before the next round of elections were held.

Officers 
The following is a list of the Riigikogu's officers during the fourth legislative session:

Chairman 
 Kaarel Eenpalu, from 02.07.1929

First Assistant Chairman 
 Mihkel Martna, from 02.07.1929

Second Assistant Chairman 
 Rudolf Penno, from 02.07.1929

Secretary 
 Arnold Paul Schulbach, from 02.07.1929

First Assistant Secretary 
 August Tõllasepp, from 02.07.1929

Second Assistant Secretary 
 Jaan Piiskar, 02.07.1929 – 13.03.1930
 Oskar Gustavson, from 13.03.1930

List of members 
Sources:

References

Further information 
 "IV Riigikogu koosseis [Composition of the fourth Riigikogu]", Riigikogu (in Estonian).

4th